Jeungsan station is a railroad station in South Korea.

 Jeungsan station (Seoul)
 Jeungsan station (Busan Metro)